Wirini is a village in Pirime district, Lanny Jaya Regency in Highland Papua province, Indonesia. Its population is 855.

Climate
Wirini has a wet tundra climate (ET) with heavy rainfall year-round.

References

Villages in Highland Papua